Onus, from Latin, indicates accountability/responsibility 

Onus may also refer to: 

 Blame
 Burden (disambiguation)
 Legal burden of proof (onus probandi)

As a surname

 Bill Onus (1906-68), Australian Aboriginal political activist, boomerang thrower
 Lin Onus (1948-96) Australian Aboriginal artist